Velocity is a quantity in physics that is related to speed. 

Velocity may also refer to:

Computing and technology
 Apache Velocity, a Java template engine
 Velocity (JavaScript library)
 Velocity (memory cache), from Microsoft
 Velocity (software development), a measure of productivity

Arts, entertainment, and media
 Velocity (album), by The Vels
 Velocity (character), a comic book character
 Velocity (film), a re-edited version of the 1960 film The Wild Ride, with new footage
 Velocity (newspaper), in Louisville, Kentucky
 Velocity (novel), by Dean Koontz
 Velocity (TV network), a Discovery Communications channel
 Velocity (video game), a 2012 shoot 'em up video game
 WWE Velocity, a wrestling television show

Other uses
 Velocity SE, an entry-level homebuilt aircraft
 Velocity XL, a high-performance homebuilt aircraft
 USS Velocity, several U.S. Navy warships
 Velocity of money, a monetary economics concept
 Velocity Tower, a tower in Sheffield
 Velo-city, a series of cycle planning conferences
 Velocity Frequent Flyer, frequent-flyer program of Virgin Australia whose airline call sign is "Velocity"